The Atlas Block, at 523 & 528 E. Pike Ave. in Columbus in Stillwater County, Montana, is a historic commercial block building which was listed on the National Register of Historic Places in 2011.

The building has housed the "New Atlas Bar" for more than a century.  It was built in 1915–16.

There is another Atlas Block building in the Helena Historic District in Helena, Montana, which is also notable.

References

National Register of Historic Places in Stillwater County, Montana
Buildings and structures completed in 1916
Commercial buildings on the National Register of Historic Places in Montana